Saint-Hilaire-du-Maine (literally Saint-Hilaire of the Maine) is a commune in the Mayenne department in northwestern France. The writer and photographer Jean-Loup Trassard was born in Saint-Hilaire-du-Maine in 1933.

See also
Communes of the Mayenne department

References

Sainthilairedumaine